The Pepper Coast or Grain Coast was a coastal area of western Africa, between Cape Mesurado and Cape Palmas. It encloses the present republic of Liberia. The name was given by European traders.

Origin of the name
The Pepper Coast got its name from the availability in the region of the melegueta pepper (Aframomum melegueta), also known as the "grain of paradise", which in turn gave rise to an alternative name, the Grain Coast. The importance of the spice is shown by the designation of the area from the Saint John River (at present-day Buchanan) to Harper in Liberia as the "Grain Coast", in reference to the availability of grains of paradise. In some cases (as shown on the map pictured above), this term covers a wider area incorporating Sierra Leone and the Ivory Coast.

See also
Slave Coast of West Africa
Gold Coast (region)
Guinea (region)
Windward Coast

References

Geography of Liberia
Pepper trade
Regions of Africa
Coasts of the Atlantic Ocean
Historical regions